Lakmé Fashion Week X FDCI is a bi-annual fashion week which takes place in Mumbai, Maharashtra, India& Delhi, India. Its Summer-Resort show takes place in March in Mumbai while the Winter-Festive show takes place in  October in Delhi.

History 
The event first took place in 1999.

Activities
It is considered one of the premier fashion events in India along with FDCI's India Fashion Week and India Runway Week. It is jointly run and organized by Lakmé, and IMG Reliance Limited, where title sponsor is Lakmé.

International models such as Naomi Campbell as well as Indian film stars such as Priyanka Chopra Jonas, Deepika Padukone, Malaika Arora Khan, and Arjun Rampal have participated in it making it one of the most prominent fashion shows in the world. International labels that have taken part in LFW include Louis Vuitton, Dolce & Gabbana, and Roberto Cavalli. Among Indian designers, Ajay Kumar, Manish Malhotra, Rohit Bal, Tarun Tahiliani, and Ritu Beri have taken part in the event. The event has been responsible for launching the careers of designers such as Sabyasachi Mukherjee. Kareena Kapoor, Jacqueline Fernandez, Sushmita Sen, Priyanka Chopra, Deepika Padukone, Bipasha Basu and Lisa Haydon have been some of the major show-stoppers till date.

See also
 Fashion in India
 India Fashion Week
 India Runway Week

References

External links

 Mumbai Auditions
 Lakme Fashion Week 2013 videos

1999 establishments in Maharashtra
Recurring events established in 1999
Annual events in India
Fashion events in India
Culture of Mumbai
Fashion weeks